Peter of Castile (June 1260, in Seville – 10 October 1283, in Ledesma), was an infante of Castile. He was a son of Alfonso X of Castile and Violant of Aragon who was also called Yolanda or Yolante.

He was Lord (señor) of Ledesma, Alba de Tormes, Salvatierra, Miranda del Castañar, Galisteo and Granadilla.

Biography

He received from his father the command of the Christian troops during the failed Siege of Algeciras (1278–79).
In 1281, Peter participated in his father's campaign  against the Kingdom of Granada.

When his eldest brother, Crown Prince Ferdinand de la Cerda, died before his father, Peter supported his brother Sancho IV of Castile, against the wishes of his father, who had appointed Ferdinand's son Alfonso de la Cerda as his successor.
For this, Peter was disinherited by his father.

Marriage and issue
He married Margaret of Narbonne, daughter of Aimery IV of Narbonne (of the House of Lara) in 1281.
They had one son
 Sancho de Castilla el de la Paz, died 1312 without issue.

He also had an illegitimate son called Sancho Pére.

Ancestry

References

Bibliography

Notes

1260 births
1283 deaths
Castilian infantes
Lords of Spain
Peter
Sons of kings